Erich Hoffmann (25 April 1868 – 8 May 1959) was a German dermatologist who was a native of Witzmitz, Pomerania.

He studied medicine at the Berlin Military Academy, and was later a professor at the Universities of Halle and Bonn.

Hoffmann is remembered for his research performed with zoologist Fritz Schaudinn (1871-1906) at the Charité Clinic in Berlin. In 1905 Schaudinn and Hoffmann discovered the bacterium that was responsible for syphilis, a spiral-shaped spirochete called Treponema pallidum. The organism was removed from a papula in the vulva of a patient with secondary syphilis. The two doctors documented their findings in a treatise called Vorläufiger Bericht über das Vorkommen von Spirochaeten in syphilitischen Krankheitsprodukten und bei Papillome.

Hoffmann left Germany during the era of National Socialism, but returned to Bonn after the war and established a laboratory. In the late 1940s he published two books about his life in medicine, titled "Wollen und Schaffen" and "Ringen um Vollendung".

References

 Anais Brasileiros de Dermatologia The Discovery of Treponema pallidum

1868 births
1959 deaths
People from Gryfice County
German dermatologists
German venereologists
People from the Province of Pomerania
Academic staff of the Martin Luther University of Halle-Wittenberg
Academic staff of the University of Bonn
Commanders Crosses of the Order of Merit of the Federal Republic of Germany
Physicians of the Charité